The genus Sayornis is a small group of medium-sized insect-eating birds, known as phoebes, in the tyrant flycatcher family Tyrannidae.

Taxonomy
The genus Sayornis that was introduced by the French naturalist Charles Lucien Bonaparte in 1854 with black phoebe (Sayornis nigricans) as the type species. The genus name is constructed from the specific part of Bonaparte's name for Say's phoebe, Muscicapa saya, and Ancient Greek ornis meaning "bird". The English Phoebe is a name for the Roman moon-goddess Diana.

Description

They are native to North and South America.

They prefer semi-open or open areas. These birds wait on a perch and then catch insects. Their nest is an open cup sometimes placed on man-made structures.

They often slowly lower and raise their tails while perched.

Species
The genus contains three species:

References

Bird genera
Tyrannidae

Taxa named by Charles Lucien Bonaparte